Edson Décimo Alves Araújo (2 December 1986 – 1 November 2014), known as Piauí, was a Brazilian footballer, who played as left back. He played for Atlético-PR, Porto-PE, Santa Cruz FC, Náutico, Salgueiro, ABC Futebol Clube, Mogi-Mirim, Oeste-SP and Boa Esporte Clube.

He was shot dead on 1 November 2014 in Floriano, Piauí.

Contract
10 September 2007 to 9 September 2010

References

External links
 furacao
 CBF
 globoesporte
 sambafoot

1986 births
2014 deaths
Sportspeople from Piauí
Deaths by firearm in Brazil
Brazilian footballers
Santa Cruz Futebol Clube players
Club Athletico Paranaense players
Boa Esporte Clube players
Association football defenders
Brazilian murder victims
Male murder victims
People murdered in Brazil